Before Hurricane Katrina, New Orleans gangs tended to be small violent  local groups divided among its 17 voting districts known as "wards". 
Although the city does not have large street gangs, NOPD classified the groups as drug organizations or "cliques," with about 10-15 members.
The most infamous criminal organizations formed in the city during the turbulent late-1980s, with the Glenn Metz Gang, the Sam Clay Orginzatation,  Hardy Boys and the Richard Pena Organization being the most notorious. Other drug crews like the Balley Boys and the Hankton Organization were also active during the 1990s.

According to New Orleans Police Department, gang related homicides spiked in 2007, which drove the city's homicide rate to a record high. Some of the most vicious cliques, like the Dooney Boys and the 9th ward G-Strip Gang, moved to other cities and clashed with each other in violent gun battles. New Orleans drug crews became involved in violent crime and murders in host cities like Atlanta, Houston, Dallas, Biloxi, Baton Rouge, and Jacksonville.  
In 2012, Mayor Mitch Landrieu formed the Multi-Agency Gang (MAG) Unit, which is the key enforcement component of the Group Violence Reduction Strategy (GVRS). The MAG Unit identifies the most dangerous and influential gang members and removes them from the community.

Post-Katrina 
 39ers Gang, multi-state  
 110ers, Lower Garden District
 Byrd Gang, Central City 
 Joesphine Dog Pound, Central City 
 Dumaine Street Gang (also known as "D-Block"), Treme
 Ride or Die, St. Roch
 Taliban Gang, Pigeon Town 
 Big 8s, St Roch 
 Ghost Gang, Central City
 Young Melf Mafia, Central City 
 International Robbin Crew (IRC), multi-state (inactive)
 Hot Block, Algiers 
 FnD Gang, Seventh Ward (inactive)
 Deuce Gang Goonies, Iberville (inactive)
 PCB, Seventh Ward.
 Mob Pirus
 Mid City Killers, Mid-City

Pre-Katrina 
 Dooney Boys, multi-state 
 Whitney Boys, Algiers
 D-Block Boys, Algiers 
 3-N-G, Central City (merged with G-Strip)  
 G-Strip, Ninth Ward (merged with 3-N-G)
 Phillip and Clara Crew, Central City (inactive)
 Hot Boys, Central City.
 Dorgenois and Dumaine Crew (now known as D' Block)
 Fischer Fools, Algiers (now known as 150)
 Cuthroat Posse, Lower Garden District
 Florida Posse, Ninth Ward (inactive) 
 7th Ward Hardheads, Seventh Ward (inactive)
 Deslonde Boys, Ninth Ward 
 Bunker Hill Boys, New Orleans East
 Porch Boys, Central City (inactive)
 Josephine and Danneel Crew, Central City   
 Cutt Boys, Central City (inactive) 
 Gotti Boys, Central City (inactive)
 CTC, Lower Ninth Ward 
 Cutoff Posse, Algiers
 11th Ward Hustlers, Irish Channel 
 Gertown Hounds, Gertown
 Eagle Street Crew, Hollygrove

References

 https://www.nola.com/news/article_0c820a69-b7a0-52ca-982c-781132011480.html  Retrieved Aug 14 2009
 https://www.nola.com/news/crime_police/article_06f42396-4b4d-5042-985b-8d5f8d106504.html  Nola.com.

 
New Orleans gangs
New Orleans
gangs